Arawakan (Arahuacan, Maipuran Arawakan, "mainstream" Arawakan, Arawakan proper), also known as Maipurean (also Maipuran, Maipureano, Maipúre), is a language family that developed among ancient indigenous peoples in South America. Branches migrated to  Central America and the Greater Antilles in the Caribbean and the Atlantic, including what is now the Bahamas. Almost all present-day South American countries are known to have been home to speakers of Arawakan languages, the exceptions being Ecuador, Uruguay, and Chile. Maipurean may be related to other language families in a hypothetical Macro-Arawakan stock.

Name
The name Maipure was given to the family by Filippo S. Gilij in 1782, after the Maipure language of Venezuela, which he used as a basis of his comparisons. It was renamed after the culturally more important Arawak language a century later. The term Arawak took over, until its use was extended by North American scholars to the broader Macro-Arawakan proposal. At that time, the name Maipurean was resurrected for the core family. See Arawakan vs Maipurean for details.

Dispersal
The Arawakan linguistic matrix hypothesis (ALMH) suggests that the modern diversity of the Arawakan language family stems from the diversification of a trade language or lingua franca that was spoken throughout much of tropical lowland South America. Proponents of this hypothesis include Santos-Granero (2002) and Eriksen (2014). Eriksen (2014) proposes that the Arawakan family had only broken up after 600 CE, but Michael (2020) considers this to be unlikely, noting that Arawakan internal diversity is greater than that of the Romance languages. On the other hand, Blench (2015) suggests a demographic expansion that had taken place over a few thousand years, similar to the dispersals of the Austronesian and Austroasiatic language families in Southeast Asia.

Language contact
As one of the most geographically widespread language families in all of the Americas, Arawakan linguistic influence can be found in many language families of South America. Jolkesky (2016) notes that there are lexical similarities with the Arawa, Bora-Muinane, Guahibo, Harakmbet-Katukina, Harakmbet, Katukina-Katawixi, Irantxe, Jaqi, Karib, Kawapana, Kayuvava, Kechua, Kwaza, Leko, Macro-Jê, Macro-Mataguayo-Guaykuru, Mapudungun, Mochika, Mura-Matanawi, Nambikwara, Omurano, Pano-Takana, Pano, Takana, Puinave-Nadahup, Taruma, Tupi, Urarina, Witoto-Okaina, Yaruro, Zaparo, Saliba-Hodi, and Tikuna-Yuri language families due to contact. However, these similarities could be due to inheritance, contact, or chance.

Languages
Classification of Maipurean is difficult because of the large number of Arawakan languages that are extinct and poorly documented. However, apart from transparent relationships that might constitute single languages, several groups of Maipurean languages are generally accepted by scholars. Many classifications agree in dividing Maipurean into northern and southern branches, but perhaps not all languages fit into one or the other. The three classifications below are accepted by all:
Ta-Maipurean = Caribbean Arawak / Ta-Arawak = Caribbean Maipuran,
Upper Amazon Maipurean = North Amazonian Arawak = Inland Maipuran,
Central Maipurean = Pareci–Xingu = Paresí–Waurá = Central Maipuran,
Piro = Purus,
Campa = Pre-Andean Maipurean = Pre-Andine Maipuran.

An early contrast between Ta-Arawak and Nu-Arawak, depending on the prefix for "I", is spurious; nu- is the ancestral form for the entire family, and ta- is an innovation of one branch of the family.

Kaufman (1994)
The following (tentative) classification is from Kaufman (1994: 57-60). Details of established branches are given in the linked articles. In addition to the family tree detailed below, there are a few languages that are "Non-Maipurean Arawakan languages or too scantily known to classify" (Kaufman 1994: 58), which include these:

 Shebaye (†)
 Lapachu (†)
 Morique (also known as Morike) (†)

Another language is also mentioned as "Arawakan":
 Salumã (also known as Salumán, Enawené-Nawé)

Including the unclassified languages mentioned above, the Maipurean family has about 64 languages. Out of them, 29 languages are now extinct: Wainumá, Mariaté, Anauyá, Amarizana, Jumana, Pasé, Cawishana, Garú, Marawá, Guinao, Yavitero, Maipure, Manao, Kariaí, Waraikú, Yabaána, Wiriná, Aruán, Taíno, Kalhíphona, Marawán-Karipurá, Saraveca, Custenau, Inapari, Kanamaré, Shebaye, Lapachu, and Morique.

Northern Maipurean
 Upper Amazon branch
 Maritime branch
 Aruán (Aroã) (†)
 Wapixana (also known as Wapishana): Atorada (also known as Atoraí), Mapidian (also known as Maopidyán), Wapishana
 Ta-Maipurean
 Palikur
 Palikur (also known as Palikúr)
 Marawán (†)
Southern Maipurean
 Western branch
 Amuesha (also known as Amoesha, Yanesha’)
 Chamicuro (also known as Chamikuro)
 Central branch
 Southern Outlier branch
 Terêna (dialects: Kinikinao, Terena, Guaná, Chané)
 Moxos group (also known as Moho)
 Moxos (Ignaciano & Trinitario)
 Baure
 Paunaka (also known as Pauna–Paikone)
 Piro group
 Campa branch (also known as Pre-Andean)

Kaufman does not report the extinct Magiana of the Moxos group.

Aikhenvald (1999)
Apart from minor decisions on whether a variety is a language or a dialect, changing names, and not addressing several poorly attested languages, Aikhenvald departs from Kaufman in breaking up the Southern Outlier and Western branches of Southern Maipurean. She assigns Salumã and Lapachu ('Apolista') to what is left of Southern Outlier ('South Arawak'); breaks up the Maritime branch of Northern Maipurean, though keeping Aruán and Palikur together; and is agnostic about the sub-grouping of the North Amazonian branch of Northern Maipurean.

The following breakdown uses Aikhenvald's nomenclature followed by Kaufman's: 
North Arawak = Northern Maipurean
Rio Branco = Kaufman's Wapishanan (2) [with Mapidian under the name "Mawayana" and Mawakwa as a possible dialect]
Palikur = Kaufman's Palikur + Aruán (3)
Caribbean = Ta-Maipurean (8) [incl. Shebaye]
North Amazonian = Upper Amazon (17 attested)
South and South-Western Arawak = Southern Maipurean
South Arawak = Terena + Kaufman's Moxos group + Salumã + Lapachu ['Apolista'] (11)
Pareci–Xingu = Central Maipurean (6)
South-Western Arawak = Piro (5)
Campa (6)
Amuesha (1)
Chamicuro (1)

Aikhenvald classifies Kaufman's unclassified languages apart from Morique. She does not classify 15 extinct languages which Kaufman had placed in various branches of Maipurean.

Aikhenvald (1999:69) classifies Mawayana with Wapishana together under a Rio Branco branch, giving for Mawayana also the names "Mapidian" and "Mawakwa" (with some reservations for the latter).

Ramirez (2001)
Internal classification of Arawakan by Henri Ramirez (2001):

2 subgroups, 10 divisions († = extinct)

unclassified: Yanesha, Chamicuro
Western
 unclassified: † Yumana, † Passé
 Japurá-Colombia division
 Piapoko, Achagua; Baniwa-Koripako, Tariana; Warekena, Mandawaka; Kabiyari; Yukuna, Wainumá-Mariaté
 † Kauixana
 Resígaro
 Upper Rio Negro division
 † Baré, † Guinau, † Anauyá-Yabahana
 Upper Orinoco division
 † Pareni, Yavitero
 † Maipure
 Negro-Roraima division
 † Arua
 † Manao, † Wirina, † Bahuana, † Cariaí
 Wapixana, Atorai
 † Mawayana
 Juruá-Jutaí division
 † Marawa
 † Waraiku
 Purus-Ucayali division
 Apurinã; Piro, Kuniba, Kanamari, Manxineri 
 Kampa
 Bolivia-Mato Grosso division
 Baure, Mojeño
 Tereno, † Kinikinao
 Caribe-Venezuela division
 Lokono; Iñeri, Garífuna; † Taino; † Caquetio
 Guajiro, † Paraujano
Eastern
 Amapá division
 Palikur, † Marawá
 Xingu-Tapajós division
 Waurá, Mehinaku; Yawalapiti
 Pareci, † Sarave

Walker & Ribeiro (2011)
Walker & Ribeiro (2011), using Bayesian computational phylogenetics, classify the Arawakan languages as follows.

The internal structures of each branch is given below. Note that the strictly binary splits are a result of the Bayesian computational methods used.

Northeast
Marawan, Palikúr
South
Kinikinau, Terena
(branch)
Baure
Moxos: Trinitario, Ignaciano
Western Amazonia
(branch)
Apurinã
(branch)
Iñapari
Piro, Manxineri
(branch)
Caquinte
(branch)
Asheninka
(branch)
 Machiguenga, Nomatsiguenga
Amuesha, Chamicuro
Circum-Caribbean
Waraicu, Marawa
(Core branch)
(Island branch)
Taíno
Island Carib, Garífuna
Lokono
Paraujano, Guajiro
Central Brazil
(branch)
Saraveka
Enawene Mawe, Paresí
(branch)
Yawalapití
Waurá, Mehináku
Central Amazonia
(branch)
Anauyá
Guinau, Baré
(branch)
Bahuana, Manao
(branch)
Arua
(branch)
Cabiai
Mawayana, Wapixana
Northwest Amazonia
(branch)
Maipure
(branch)
Yavitero
Baniva, Warekena
(branch)
Pasé, Yumana
(branch)
Resígaro
(branch)
Cabiyari
(branch)
Kauixana
(branch)
Yukuna
Mariaté, Wainumá
(branch)
Achagua, Piapoco
(branch)
Mandawaka, Guarekena
(branch)
Tariana
(branch)
Kurripako
Baniwa, Karutana

Jolkesky (2016)
Internal classification by Jolkesky (2016):

(† = extinct)

Arawak
Yanesha
Western
Aguachile †
Chamikuro
Mamoré-Paraguai
Mamoré-Guaporé (Portuguese article)
Mojo-Paunaka
Mojo: Ignaciano; Trinitario
Paunaka
Baure-Paikoneka
Baure: Baure; Joaquiniano; Muxojeone †
Paikoneka †
Terena: Chane †; Guana †; Kinikinau; Terena
Negro-Putumayo
Jumana-Pase: Jumana †; Pase †
Kaishana †
Nawiki
Kabiyari
Karu-Tariana
Karu: Baniwa; Kuripako
Tariana
Mepuri †
Piapoko-Achagua: Achagua; Piapoko
Wainambu †
Warekena-Mandawaka: Warekena; Mandawaka †
Yukuna-Wainuma: Mariate †; Wainuma †; Yukuna
Resigaro
Wirina †
Orinoco
Yavitero-Baniva: Baniva; Yavitero †
Maipure †
Pre-Andine
Ashaninka-Nomatsigenga
Nomatsigenga
Machiguenga-Nanti
Ashaninka-Kakinte
Kakinte
Ashaninka-Asheninka
Ashaninka: Ashaninka
Asheninka: Asheninka Pajonal; Asheninka Perene; Asheninka Pichis; Asheninka Ucayali; Ashininka
Purus
Apurinã
Iñapari
Piro-Manchineri: Kanamare †; Kuniba †; Manchineri; Mashko Piro; Yine
Eastern
Lower Amazon
Atlantic: Marawan †; Palikur
Guaporé-Tapajós
Saraveka †
Tapajós: Enawene-Nawe; Paresi
Xingu
Kustenau †
Waura-Mehinako: Mehinaku; Waura
Yawalapiti
Waraiku: Waraiku †
Solimões-Caribbean: Marawan †; Palikur
Marawa †
Caribbean
Kaketio †
Wayuu-Añun
Añun
Wayuu
Lokono-Iñeri
Iñeri: Garifuna; Kalhiphona †
Lokono
Shebayo †
Taino †
Negro-Branco
Arua †
Mainatari †
Negro
Bare-Guinao: Bare; Guinao †
Bawana-Kariai-Manao: Bawana †; Kariai †; Manao †
Yabaana †
Branco
Mawayana
Wapishana-Parawana: Aroaki †; Atorada; Parawana †; Wapishana

Nikulin & Carvalho (2019)
Internal classification by Nikulin & Carvalho (2019: 270):

Yanesha’
Chamicuro
Palikur
Maritime
Island Carib; Garífuna
Lokono; Wayuunaiki, Añun
Rio Branco
Wapixana
Mawayana
Japurá-Colômbia
Piapoco
Achagua
Yucuna
Resígaro
Tariana
Baniwa-Koripako
Warekena Antigo
Orinoco
Baré
Yavitero
Baniva of Guainia
Maipure
Warekena of Xié
Central
Paresí
Enawenê-Nawê
Xingu
Yawalapití
Waurá; Mehináku
Purus
Apurinã
Iñapari; Yine/Manxinéru
Campa
Nomatsiguenga
Matsiguenga
Nanti
Caquinte
Asháninka
Ashéninka
Bolívia-Paraná
Baure; Carmelito; Joaquiniano
Terena; Paunaka; Mojeño (Trinitário, Ignaciano, Loretano, Javeriano)

Phonological innovations characterizing some of the branches:
Maritime: loss of medial Proto-Arawakan *-n-.
Lokono-Wayuu: first person singular prefix *ta- replacing *nu-. Carvalho also reconstructs the suffix *-ja (possibly a deictic) and *kabɨnɨ ‘three’ as characteristic of this subgroup.
Campa: lexical innovations such as *iNʧato ‘tree’, *-taki ‘bark’, *-toNki ‘bone’, etc. There are also typological innovations due to contact with Andean languages such as Quechua.

Ramirez (2020)
The internal classification of Arawakan by Henri Ramirez (2020) is as follows. This classification differs quite substantially from his previous classification (Ramirez 2001), but is very similar to the one proposed by Jolkesky (2016).

12 subgroups consisting of 56 languages (29 living and 27 extinct) († = extinct)

Japurá-Colombia (Portuguese article)
† Mepuri
† Yumana, † Passé
† Kauixana
Peripheral
† Mandawaka, Warekena (do San Miguel); Baniwa-Koripako
Piapoco, Achagua; Kabiyari
† Resígaro
† Wainumá-Mariaté
Yukuna
Upper Orinoco
Baniva de Maroa
† Pareni-Yavitero
† Maipure
Central-Amazon-Antilles ? (probable branch)
Amazon-Antilles
Guajiro, † Paraujano
† Taino, Iñeri, Loko, † Marawá
? † Waraiku
? † Wirina
Middle Rio Negro
† Baré
† Guinau
† Anauyá; † Mainatari, † Yabahana
Central
† Bahuana; † Manao, † Cariaí
† Aruã
Pidjanan
† Mawayana
Wapixana, † Parawana, † Aroaqui
? † Shebayo
Mato Grosso-Palikur ? (probable branch)
Amapá
Palikur
Mato Grosso
Xingu
Waurá
Yawalapiti
Xaray
Salumã
Pareci
† Sarave
Bolivia-Purus-Kampa-(Amuesha) ? (probable branch)
Bolivia
Baure
Pauna; Mojeño, Tereno
Purus
† Iñapari
Piro
Apurinã
† Cararí
Pre-Andine
Kampa
Pozuzo
Amuesha
Lower Ucayali
† Chamicuro
? † Moríque

Varieties
Below is a full list of Arawakan language varieties listed by Loukotka (1968), including names of unattested varieties.

Island languages
Taino / Nitaino - once spoken in the Conquest days on the Greater Antilles Islands of Cuba, Dominican Republic, Haiti, Puerto Rico and Jamaica. Dialects are:
Taino of Haiti and Quisqueya - extinct language of the island were Dominican Republic and The Republic of Haiti.
Taino of Cuba - once spoken on the island of Cuba; in the nineteenth century only in the villages of Jiguaní, Bayano, and Quivicán; now the last descendants speak only Spanish.
Borinquen - once spoken on the island of Puerto Rico.
Yamaye - once spoken on the island of Jamaica.
Lucaya - once spoken on the Bahamas Islands.
Eyed / Allouage - once spoken in the Lesser Antilles.
 - spoken on the eastern part of the island of Trinidad.
Naparina - once spoken on the island of Trinidad. (Unattested.)
Caliponau - language spoken by the women of the Carib tribes in the Lesser Antilles.

Guiana language
Arawak / Aruaqui / Luccumi / Locono - spoken in the Guianas. Dialects are:
Western - spoken in Guyana.
Eastern - spoken in French Guiana on the Curipi River and Oyapoque River.

Central group
Wapishana / Matisana / Wapityan / Uapixana - spoken on the Tacutu River, Mahú River, and Surumú River, territory of Rio Branco, Brazil, and in the adjoining region in Guyana.
Amariba - once spoken at the sources of the Tacutu River and Rupununi River, Guyana. (Unattested.)
Atorai / Attaraye / Daurí - spoken between the Rupununi River and Kuyuwini River, Guyana.

Mapidian group
Mapidian / Maotityan - spoken at the sources of the Apiniwau River, Guyana, now perhaps extinct.
Mawakwa - once spoken on the Mavaca River, Venezuela.

Goajira group
Goajira / Uáira - language spoken on the Goajira Peninsula in Colombia and Venezuela with two dialects, Guimpejegual and Gopujegual.
Paraujano / Parancan / Parawogwan / Pará - spoken by a tribe of lake dwellers on Lake Maracaibo, Zulia state, Venezuela.
Alile - once spoken on the Guasape River, state of Zulia, Venezuela. (Unattested.)
Onota - once spoken between Lake Maracaibo and the Palmar River in the same region, Zulia state, Venezuela. (Unattested.)
Guanebucán - extinct language once spoken on the Hacha River, department of Magdalena, Colombia. (Unattested.)
Cosina / Coquibacoa - extinct language of a little known tribe of the Serranía Cosina, Goajira Peninsula, Colombia. (Unattested.)

Caquetío group
Caquetío - extinct language once spoken on the islands of Curaçao and Aruba near the Venezuelan coast, on the Yaracuy River, Portuguesa River, and Apure River, Venezuela. (only several words)
Ajagua - once spoken on the Tocuyo River near Carera, state of Lara, Venezuela. (only two words and patronyms.)
Quinó - once spoken in the village of Lagunillas, state of Mérida, Venezuela. (Nothing.)
Tororó / Auyama - once spoken in the village of San Cristóbal, state of Táchira. (Febres Cordero 1921, pp. 116–160 passim, only six words.)
Aviamo - once spoken on the Uribante River, state of Táchira. (Unattested.)
Tecua - once spoken on the Lengupa River and in the village of Teguas, department of Boyacá, Colombia. (Unattested.)
Yaguai - once spoken on the Arichuna River, state of Apure, Venezuela. (Unattested.)
Cocaima - once spoken between the Setenta River and Matiyure River, state of Apure, Venezuela. (Unattested.)
Chacanta - once spoken on the Mucuchachi River, state of Mérida. (Unattested.)
Caparo - once spoken on the Caparo River, Santander, Colombia. (Unattested.)
Támud - once spoken northeast of the Sagamoso River, Santander, Colombia. (Unattested.)
Burgua - once spoken near San Camilo on the Burgua River, Santander, Colombia. (Unattested.)
Cuite - once spoken on the Cuite River, Santander, Colombia. (Unattested.)
Queniquea - once spoken in the same hill region in Colombia on the Pereno River. (Unattested.)
Chucuna - once spoken between the Manacacías River and Vichada River, territories of Meta and Vichada, Colombia. (Unattested.)
Guayupe - spoken on the Güejar River and Ariari River, Meta territory.
Sae - once spoken by the neighbors of the Guayupe tribe in the same region. (Unattested.)
Sutagao - spoken once on the Pasca River and Sumapaz River, Meta territory. (Unattested.)
Chocue / Choque - once spoken on the Herorú River and Guayabero River, Meta territory. (Unattested.)
Eperigua - once spoken at the sources of the Güejar River and near San Juan de los Llanos, Meta territory. (Unattested.)
Aricagua - once spoken in the state of Mérida, Venezuela. (Unattested.)
Achagua - spoken on the Apure River and Arauca River in the department of Boyacá and territory of Meta, Colombia.
Piapoco / Mitua / Dzáse - spoken on the Guaviare River, territory of Vaupés, Colombia.
Cabere / Cabre - once spoken on the Teviare River and Zama River, Vichada territory.
Maniba / Camaniba - spoken by a little known tribe that lived on the middle course of the Guaviare River, Vaupés territory, Colombia. (Unattested.)
Amarizana - extinct language once spoken on the Vera River and Aguas Blancas River, territory of Meta.

Maypure group
Maypure - extinct language once spoken in the village of Maipures, Vichada territory, Colombia. Inhabitants now speak only Spanish.
Avani / Abane - once spoken on the Auvana River and Tipapa River, Amazonas territory, Venezuela. (Gilij 1780-1784, vol. 3, p. 383, only six words.)

Guinau group
Baníva - language spoken on the Orinoco River, especially in the village of San Fernando de Atabapo, Amazonas territory, Venezuela.
Yavitero / Pareni / Yavitano - spoken on the Atabapo River in the village of Yavita.

Guinau group
Guinau / Inao / Guniare / Temomeyéme / Quinhau - once spoken at the sources of the Caura River and Merevari River, state of Bolívar, Venezuela, now perhaps extinct.

Baré group
Baré / Ihini / Arihini - spoken on the Casiquiare River, territory of Amazonas, Venezuela, and on the upper course of the Negro River, state of Amazonas, Brazil.
Uarequena - spoken on the Guainía River, Vaupés territory, Colombia.
Adzáneni / Adyána / Izaneni - spoken at the sources of the Caiarí River and on the Apui River, frontier of Colombia and Brazil.
Carútana / Corecarú / Yauareté-tapuya - spoken on the frontier between Colombia and Brazil on the Içana River.
Katapolítani / Acayaca / Cadaupuritani - spoken on the Içana River in the village of Tunuhy, Brazil.
Siusí / Ualíperi-dákeni / Uereperidákeni - spoken on the lower course of the Caiarí River and Içana River and on the middle course of the Aiari River, state of Amazonas, Brazil.
Moriwene / Sucuriyú-tapuya - spoken on the Içana River in the village of Seringa Upita, state of Amazonas, Brazil.
Mapanai / Ira-tapuya - spoken on the Içana River near Cachoeira Yandú, state of Amazonas.
Hohodene / Huhúteni - spoken on the Cubate River, state of Amazonas.
Maulieni / Káua-tapuya - spoken on the Aiari River, state of Amazonas.

Ipéca group
Ipéca / Kumada-mínanei / Baniva de rio Içana - spoken on the Içana River near the village of San Pedro, frontier region of Brazil and Colombia.
Payualiene / Payoariene / Pacu-tapuya - spoken in the same frontier region on the Arara-paraná River.
Curipaco - spoken on the Guainía River, territory of Amazonas, Venezuela.
Kárro - spoken in the territory of Amazonas on the Puitana River.
Kapité-Mínanei / Coatí-tapuya - spoken at the sources of the Içana River, Vaupés territory, Colombia.

Tariana group
Tariana / Yavi - spoken in the villages of Ipanoré and Yauareté on the Caiarí River, Vaupés Territory, Colombia.
Iyäine / Kumandene / Yurupary-tapuya - spoken in the same region north of the Tariana tribe. Now only Tucano is spoken. (Unattested.)
Cauyari / Acaroa / Cabuyarí - once spoken on the Cananari River and on the middle course of the Apaporis River, territory of Amazonas, Colombia. Now perhaps extinct.

Mandauáca group
Mandauáca / Maldavaca - spoken on the Baria River, Capabury River, and Pasimoni River, Amazonas territory, Venezuela.
Cunipúsana - once spoken in Amazonas territory on the Siapa River. (Unattested.)

Manáo group
Manáo / Oremanao / Manoa - extinct language once spoken around the modern city of Manaus on the Negro River, state of Amazonas, Brazil.
Arina - extinct language once spoken on the middle course of the Marauiá River, Amazonas state. (Unattested.)
Cariay / Carihiahy - extinct language once spoken between the Negro River, Araçá River, and Padauari River, territory of Rio Branco, Brazil.
Bahuana - spoken between the Padauari River and Araçá River. (Unattested.)
Uaranacoacena - extinct language once spoken between the Branco River, Negro River, and Araçá River, Amazonas. (Unattested.)
Arauaqui - extinct language once spoken between the Negro River and Uatuma River. A few descendants now speak only Lingua Geral or Portuguese. (Unattested.)
Dapatarú - once spoken between the Uatuma River and Urubu River and on the island of Saracá, Amazonas. (Unattested.)
Aniba - once spoken on the Aniba River and around Saracá lagoon. (Unattested.)
Caboquena - once spoken on the Urubu River, Amazonas. (Unattested.)
Caburichena - once spoken on the right bank of the Negro River. (Unattested.)
Seden - once spoken between the Uatuma River and Negro River. (Unattested.)

Uirina group
Uirina - extinct language once spoken at the sources of the Marari River, territory of Rio Branco.
Yabaána / Jabâ-ana / Hobacana - language of a tribe in the territory of Rio Branco, on the Marauiá River and Cauaburi River.
Anauyá - spoken by a little known tribe on the Castaño River, territory of Amazonas, Venezuela.

Chiriána group
Chiriána / Barauána - spoken between the Marari River and Demini River, territory of Rio Branco.

Yukúna group
Yukúna - spoken on the Miritíparaná River, Amazonas territory, Colombia.
Matapí - spoken in the same region, Amazonas territory, near Campoamor. (Unattested.)
Guarú / Garú - spoken on the Mamurá River, Cuama River, and Meta River, territory of Caquetá, Colombia.

Resigaro group
Resigaro / Rrah~nihin / Rosigaro - spoken by a few families on the Igaraparaná River near Casa Arana.

Araicú group
Marawa / Maragua - spoken in the nineteenth century between the Juruá River and Jutai River, now in a single village at the mouth of the Juruá River, Amazonas.

Araicú group
Araicú / Waraikú - extinct language once spoken at the sources of the Jandiatuba River and on the right bank of the Jutai River, Amazonas.

Uainumá group
Uainumá / Ajuano / Wainumá / Inabishana / Uainamby-tapuya / Uaypi - extinct language once spoken on the Upi River, a tributary of the Içá River, Amazonas.
Mariaté / Muriaté - extinct language once spoken at the mouth of the Içá River.

Jumana group
Jumana / Shomana - extinct language once spoken on the Puruê River and Juami River, Amazonas state.
Passé / Pazé - extinct language once spoken between the Negro River, Japurá River, and Içá River. The few descendants now speak only Portuguese.

Cauishana group
Cauishana / Kayuishana / Noll-hína - now spoken by a few families on the Tocantins River and on Lake Mapari, Amazonas.
Pariana - extinct language once spoken on the middle course of the Marauiá River. (Unattested.)

Pre-Andine group
Campa / Anti / Atzíri / Thampa / Kuruparia - spoken on the Urubamba River and Ucayali River, department of Cuzco, Peru.
Machiganga / Ugunichire / Mashigango - spoken in the department of Cuzco on the Mantaro River, Apurimac River, Urubamba River, and Paucartambo River. Dialects are:
Chanchamayo - spoken on the Perené River.
Catongo - spoken on the Tambo River.
Machiringa - spoken on the Apurimac River and Ene River. (Unattested.)
Piro / Simirinche - spoken in the department of Loreto on the Inuya River.
Chontaquiro - spoken on the Iaco River, Caeté River, and Chandless River, territory of Acre, Brazil.
Mashco / Sirineiri / Moeno - spoken on the Pilcopata River, department of Madre de Dios, Peru.
Curia - spoken on the Murú River and Embira River, Acre, now perhaps extinct. (Unattested.)
Quirineri - spoken on the Paucartambo River and Manu River, department of Cuzco (Oppenheim 1948).
Maneteneri - extinct language from the Purus River, Aquirí River, Caspatá River, and Araçá River, Acre territory.
Inapari / Mashco Piro - spoken between the Tacutimani River and Amigo River, department of Madre de Dios, now perhaps extinct.
Huachipairi - extinct language once spoken on the Cosñipata River and Pilcopata River, department of Madre de Dios.
Kushichineri / Cushitineri - spoken in Acre territory on the Curumaha River by a small tribe.
Cuniba - extinct language once spoken between the Juruazinho River and Jutaí River and on the Mapuá River, state of Amazonas.
Puncuri - spoken on the Puncuri River, Acre. (Unattested.)
Kanamare / Canamirim - spoken in the same territory on the Acre, Irariapé River and Abuña River, now probably extinct.
Epetineri - once spoken on the Pijiria River, tributary of the Urubamba River, Peru. (Unattested.)
Pucapucari - once spoken on the Camisia River and Tunquini River, Peru. (Unattested.)
Tucurina - spoken by a few individuals on the Igarapé Cuchicha River, a tributary of the Chandless River, Acre. (Unattested.)

Ipurina group
Ipurina / Apurimã / Kangiti - spoken along the Purus River from the mouth of the Sepatiní River to the mouth of the Yaco River, Amazonas.
Casharari - spoken by a little known tribe inhabiting the tropical forests between the Abuña River and Ituxí River and on the tributaries, Curequeta River and Iquirí River, in Acre. (Unattested.)

Apolista group
Apolista / Lapachu / Aguachile - extinct language once spoken in the old mission of Apolobamba, province of La Paz, Bolivia.

Mojo group
Mojo / Ignaciano / Morocosi - spoken on the Mamoré River and on the plains of Mojos, Beni province, Bolivia.
Baure / Chiquimiti - spoken on the Blanco River and around the city of Baures in the same region.
Muchojeone - extinct language once spoken at the old mission El Carmen in Beni province, Bolivia.
Suberiono - extinct language once spoken west of the Mamoré River and the Guapay River, Bolivia. (Unattested.)
Pauna - extinct language once spoken at the sources of the Baures River, Santa Cruz province, Bolivia.
Paicone - extinct language from the sources of the Paragúa River, Santa Cruz province, Bolivia.

Paresi group
Sarave / Zarabe - spoken on the Verde River and Paragúa River, Santa Cruz province, Bolivia, now perhaps extinct.
Parecí / Arití / Maimbari / Mahibarez - language with dialects:
Caxinití - spoken on the Sumidouro River, Sepotuba River, and Sucuriú River, Mato Grosso, Brazil.
Waimaré - spoken in Mato Grosso on the Verde River and Timalatía River.
Kozariní / Pareci-Cabixi - spoken in Mato Grosso on the Juba River, Cabaçal River, Jaurú River, Guaporé River, Verde River, Papagaio River, Burití River, and Juruena River.
Uariteré - spoken on the Pimenta Bueno River, territory of Rondônia. (Unattested.)

Chané group
Chané / Izoceño - formerly spoken on the Itiyuro River, Salta province, Argentina, but now the tribe speaks only a language of the Tupi stock and the old language serves only for religious ceremonies. (only a few words.)
Guaná / Layano - once spoken on the Yacaré River and Galván River, Paraguay, now on the Miranda River, Mato Grosso, Brazil.
Terena - spoken in Mato Grosso on the Miranda River and Jijui River.
Echoaladí / Choarana - extinct language once spoken in Mato Grosso. (Unattested.)
Quiniquinao / Equiniquinao - once spoken near Albuquerque, now by only a few families on the Posto Cachoeirinha near Miranda, Mato Grosso do Sul.

Waurá group
Waurá - spoken on the Batoví River (a tributary of the Xingú River) Mato Grosso.
Kustenáu - spoken in the same region, Mato Grosso, on the Batoví River and Jatobá River
Yaulapíti / Yawarapiti / Ualapiti - spoken between the Meinacu River and Curisevú River, Mato Grosso.
Mehináku / Meinacu / Mináko - spoken between the Batoví River and Curisevú River.
Agavotocueng - spoken by an unknown tribe between the Curisevú River and Culuene River. (Unattested.)

Marawan group
Marawan / Maraon - spoken on the Oiapoque River and Curipi River, Amapá territory.
Caripurá / Karipuere - spoken in Amapá territory on the Urucauá River.
Palicur / Parikurú - once spoken on the middle course of the Calçoene River and on the upper course of the Casipore River, now on the Urucauá River in Amapá territory.
Caranariú - once spoken on the Urucauá River, now extinct. (Unattested.)
Tocoyene - once spoken in Amapá territory on the Uanarí River. (Unattested.)
Macapá - once spoken on the Camopi River and Yaroupi River, French Guiana, later on the upper course of the Pará River, state of Pará, Brazil; now perhaps extinct. (Unattested.)
Tucujú - once spoken on the Jarí River, territory of Amapá, now perhaps extinct. (Unattested.)
Mapruan - once spoken on the Oiac River, territory of Amapá. (Unattested.)

Aruan group
Aruan / Aroã - originally spoken on the north coast of Marajó Island, Pará, later on the Uaçá River, Amapá territory. A few descendants now speak only a French creole dialect.
Sacaca - extinct language once spoken in the eastern part of Marajó Island.

Moríque group
Moríque / Mayoruna - spoken on the border of Brazil and Peru, on the Javarí River.

Chamicuro group
Chamicuro - spoken on the Chamicuro River, department of Loreto, Peru.
Chicluna - extinct language once spoken in the same region east of the Aguano tribe. (Unattested.)
Aguano / Awáno - extinct language of a tribe that lived on the lower course of the Huallaga River. The descendants, in the villages of San Lorenzo, San Xavier, and Santa Cruz, now speak only Quechua. (Unattested.)
Maparina - once spoken in the same region on the lower course of the Ucayali River and at the old mission of Santiago. (Unattested.)
Cutinana - once spoken on the Samiria River, Loreto. (Unattested.)
Tibilo - once spoken in San Lorenzo village, Loreto region. (Unattested.)

Lorenzo group
Amoishe / Amlsha / Amuescha / Amage / Lorenzo - once spoken on the Paucartambo River and Colorado River, department of Cuzco, Peru; now mainly Quechua is spoken.
Chunatahua - once spoken at the mouth of the Chinchao River, department of Huánuco, Peru. (Unattested.)
Panatahua - spoken in the same region on the right bank of the Huallaga River between Coyumba and Monzón, now perhaps extinct. (Unattested.)
Chusco - once spoken in the same region as Panatahua near Huánuco. (Unattested.)

Guahibo group
Guahibo - language spoken by many tribes in Colombia and Venezuela on the Meta River, Arauca River, Vichada River, and Orinoco River.
Dialects:
Cuiloto - spoken on the Cuiloto River and Cravo Norte River, Arauca territory, Colombia. (Unattested.)
Cuiva - spoken on the Meta River, Vichada territory, Colombia. (Unattested.)
Amorúa - spoken in the same region on the Bita River. (Unattested.)
Chiricoa - spoken on the Ele River and Lipa River, department of Arauca, on the Cravo Norte River and Arauca River, Arauca territory, Colombia, and on the Cinaruquito River, Cinamco River, Capanaparo River, and Arichuna River, state of Apure, Venezuela. (Hildebrandt ms.)
Sicuane - spoken on the Tuparro River, Vichada territory, Colombia. (Unattested.)
Cuiapo Pihibi - spoken on the Tomo River, Vichada territory. (Unattested.)
Yamu - spoken on the right bank of the Ariari River, Meta territory. (Unattested.)
Catarro - spoken in the Meta territory on the Yucavo River and in the old mission of San Miguel de Salivas. (Unattested.)
Chumya / Bisanigua - language, now probably extinct, once spoken on the Güejar River and in El Piñal.
Guayabero / Guyaverun - spoken in the Meta territory on the Guayabero River.

Arawakan vs. Maipurean
In 1783, the Italian priest Filippo Salvatore Gilii recognized the unity of the Maipure language of the Orinoco and Moxos of Bolivia; he named their family Maipure. It was renamed Arawak by Von den Steinen (1886) and Brinten (1891) after Arawak in the Guianas, one of the major languages of the family. The modern equivalents are Maipurean or Maipuran and Arawak or Arawakan.

The term Arawakan is now used in two senses. South American scholars use Aruák for the family demonstrated by Gilij and subsequent linguists. In North America, however, scholars have used the term to include a hypothesis adding the Guajiboan and Arawan families. In North America, scholars use the name Maipurean to distinguish the core family, which is sometimes called core Arawak(an) or Arawak(an) proper instead.

Kaufman (1990: 40) relates the following:
[The Arawakan] name is the one normally applied to what is here called Maipurean. Maipurean used to be thought to be a major subgroup of Arawakan, but all the living Arawakan languages, at least, seem to need to be subgrouped with languages already found within Maipurean as commonly defined. The sorting out of the labels Maipurean and Arawakan will have to await a more sophisticated classification of the languages in question than is possible at the present state of comparative studies.

Characteristics
The languages called Arawakan or Maipurean were originally recognized as a separate group in the late nineteenth century. Almost all the languages now called Arawakan share a first-person singular prefix nu-, but Arawak proper has ta-. Other commonalities include a second-person singular pi-, relative ka-, and negative ma-.

The Arawak language family, as constituted by L. Adam, at first by the name of Maypure, has been called by Von den Steinen "Nu-Arawak" from the prenominal prefix "nu-" for the first person. This is common to all the Arawak tribes scattered along the coasts from Suriname to Guyana.

Upper Paraguay has Arawakan-language tribes: the Quinquinaos, the Layanas, etc. (This is the Moho-Mbaure group of L. Quevedo). In the islands of Marajos, in the middle of the estuary of the Amazon, the Aruan people spoke an Arawak dialect. The peninsula of Goajira (north of Venezuela) is occupied by the Goajires tribe, also Arawakan speakers. In 1890–95, De Brette estimated a population of 3,000 persons in the Goajires.

C. H. de Goeje's published vocabulary of 1928 outlines the Lokono/Arawak (Suriname and Guyana) 1400 items, comprising mostly morphemes (stems, affixes) and morpheme partials (single sounds), and only rarely compounded, derived, or otherwise complex sequences; and from Nancy P. Hickerson's British Guiana manuscript vocabulary of 500 items. However, most entries which reflect acculturation are direct borrowings from one or another of three model languages (Spanish, Dutch, English).  Of the 1400 entries in de Goeje, 106 reflect European contact; 98 of these are loans. Nouns which occur with the verbalizing suffix described above number 9 out of the 98 loans.

Phonology 
Though a great deal of variation can be found from language to language, the following is a general composite statement of the consonants and vowels typically found in Arawak languages, according to Aikhenvald (1999):

For more detailed notes on specific languages see Aikhenvald (1999) pp. 76–77.

Shared morphological traits

General morphological type
Arawakan languages are polysynthetic and mostly head-marking. They have fairly complex verb morphology. Noun morphology is much less complex and tends to be similar across the family. Arawakan languages are mostly suffixing, with just a few prefixes.

Alienable and inalienable possession
Arawakan languages tend to distinguish alienable and inalienable possession. A feature found throughout the Arawakan family is a suffix (whose reconstructed Proto-Arawakan form is /*-tsi/) that allows the inalienable (and obligatorily possessed) body-part nouns to remain unpossessed. This suffix essentially converts inalienable body-part nouns into alienable nouns. It can only be added to body-part nouns and not to kinship nouns (which are also treated as inalienable). An example from the Pareci language is given below:

{|
| no-tiho
|-
| 1SG-face
|-
| my face
|}

{|
| tiho-ti
|-
| face-ALIEN
|-
| (someone's) face
|}

Classifiers
Many Arawakan languages have a system of classifier morphemes that mark the semantic category of the head noun of a noun phrase on most other elements of the noun phrase. The example below is from the Tariana language, in which classifier suffixes mark the semantic category of the head noun on all elements of a noun phrase other than the head noun (including adjectives, numerals, demonstratives, possessives) and on the verb of the clause:

{|
| ha-dapana || pa-dapana || pani-si || nu-ya-dapana || hanu-dapana
|-
| DEM-CL:HOUSE || one-CL:HOUSE || house-NON.POSSV || 1SG-POSSV-CL:HOUSE || big-CL:HOUSE
|}

{|
| heku || na-ni-ni-dapana-mahka
|-
| wood || 3PL-make-TOPIC.ADVANCING.VOICE-CL.HOUSE-REC.PAST.NON.VISUAL
|-
| colspan="2" | 'This one big house of mine is made of wood.'
|}

Subject and object cross-referencing on the verb
Most Arawakan languages have split-intransitive alignment systems of subject and object cross-referencing on the verb. The agentive arguments of both transitive and intransitive verbs are marked with prefixes, whereas the patientive arguments of both transitive and intransitive verbs are marked with suffixes. The following example from Baniwa of Içana shows a typical Arawakan split-intransitive alignment:

{|
| ri-kapa-ni
|-
| 3SG.NFEM.AGENT-see-3SG.NFEM.PATIENT
|-
| 'He sees him/it.'
|}

{|
| ri-emhani
|-
| 3SG.NFEM.AGENT-walk
|-
| 'He walks.'
|}

{|
| hape-ka-ni
|-
| be.cold-DECL-3SG.NFEM.PATIENT
|-
| 'He/it is cold.'
|}

The prefixes and suffixes used for subject and object cross-referencing on the verb are stable throughout the Arawakan languages, and can therefore be reconstructed for Proto-Arawakan. The table below shows the likely forms of Proto-Arawakan:

Some examples
The Arawak word for maize is marisi, and various forms of this word are found among the related languages:
 Lokono, marisi, Guyana.
 Taíno, mahisi or mahis, Greater Antilles.
 Cauixana, mazy, Rio Jupura.
 Wayuu, maikki, Goajira Peninsula.
 Passes, mary, Lower Jupura.
 Puri, maky, Rio Paraiba.
 Wauja, mainki, Upper Xingu River.

Geographic distribution
Arawak is the largest family in the Americas with the respect to number of languages. The Arawakan languages are spoken by peoples occupying a large swath of territory, from the eastern slopes of the central Andes Mountains in Peru and Bolivia, across the Amazon basin of Brazil, northward into Suriname, Guyana, French Guiana, Venezuela, Trinidad and Tobago and Colombia on the northern coast of South America, and as far north as Nicaragua, Honduras, Belize and Guatemala. The languages used to be found in Argentina and Paraguay as well.

Arawak-speaking peoples migrated to islands in the Caribbean some 2,500 years ago, settling the Greater Antilles and the Bahamas. It is possible that some poorly attested extinct languages in North America, such as the languages of the Cusabo and Congaree in South Carolina, were members of this family.

Taíno, commonly called Island Arawak, was spoken on the islands of Cuba, Dominican Republic, Haiti, Puerto Rico, Jamaica, and the Bahamas. A few Taino words are still used by English, Spanish, or Haitian Creole-speaking descendants in these islands. The Taíno language was scantily attested but its classification within the Arawakan family is uncontroversial. Its closest relative among the better attested Arawakan languages seems to be the Wayuu language, spoken in Colombia and Venezuela. Scholars have suggested that the Wayuu are descended from Taíno refugees, but the theory seems impossible to prove or disprove.

Garífuna (or Black Carib) is another Arawakan language originating on the islands.  It developed as the result of forced migration among people of mixed Arawak, Carib, and African descent. It is estimated to have about 195,800 speakers in Honduras, Nicaragua, Guatemala and Belize combined.

Today the Arawakan languages with the most speakers are among the more recent Ta-Arawakan (Ta-Maipurean) groups: Wayuu [Goajiro], with about 300,000 speakers; and Garifuna, with about 100,000 speakers. The Campa group is next; Asháninca or Campa proper has 15–18,000 speakers; and Ashéninca 18–25,000. After that probably comes Terêna, with 10,000 speakers; and Yanesha' [Amuesha] with 6–8,000.

Vocabulary
Loukotka (1968) lists the following basic vocabulary items for the Arawakan languages.

Proto-language

Proto-Arawak reconstructions by Aikhenvald (2002):

For lists of Proto-Arawakan reconstructions by Jolkesky (2016) and Ramirez (2019), see the corresponding Portuguese article.

See also
Arawak peoples
English words of Arawakan origin
Classification of indigenous peoples of the Americas

Notes

References 
 Aikhenvald, Alexandra Y. (1999). The Arawak language family. In R. M. W. Dixon & A. Y. Aikhenvald (Eds.), The Amazonian languages. Cambridge: Cambridge University Press. ; .
 de Goeje, C. H., (1928). The Arawak language of Guiana, Verhandelingen der Koninklijke Akademie van Wetenschappen, Amsterdam, Afdeling Letterkunde, Nieuwe Reeks.
 Deniker, Joseph. (1900). The races of man: an outline of anthropology and ethnography.
 Garifuna. (2015). In M. P. Lewis, G. F. Simmons, & C. D. Fennig (Eds.), Ethnologue: Languages of the world (18th ed.). Dallas, TX: SIL International.
 Kaufman, Terrence. (1990). Language history in South America: What we know and how to know more. In D. L. Payne (Ed.), Amazonian linguistics: Studies in lowland South American languages (pp. 13–67). Austin: University of Texas Press. .
 Kaufman, Terrence. (1994). The native languages of South America. In C. Mosley & R.E. Asher (Eds.), Atlas of the world's languages (pp. 46–76). London: Routledge.
 Nordhoff, Sebastian; Hammarström, Harald; Forkel, Robert; Haspelmath, Martin, eds. (2013). "Arawakan". Glottolog. Leipzig: Max Planck Institute for Evolutionary Anthropology.    
 Rudes, Blair A. "Pre-Columbian Links to the Caribbean: Evidence Connecting Cusabo to Taino", paper presented at Language Variety in the South III conference, Tuscaloosa, AL, 16 April 2004.

Further reading

 Campbell, Lyle. (1997). American Indian languages: The historical linguistics of Native America. New York: Oxford University Press. .
 Derbyshire, Desmond C. (1992). Arawakan languages. In W. Bright (Ed.), International encyclopedia of linguistics (Vol. 1, pp. 102–105). New Oxford: Oxford University Press.
 Migliazza, Ernest C.; & Campbell, Lyle. (1988). Panorama general de las lenguas indígenas en América (pp. 223). Historia general de América (Vol. 10). Caracas: Instituto Panamericano de Geografía e Historia.
 Payne, David. (1991). A classification of Maipuran (Arawakan) languages based on shared lexical retentions. In D. C. Derbyshire & G. K. Pullum (Eds.), Handbook of Amazonian languages (Vol. 3, pp. 355–499). Berlin: Mouton de Gruyter.
 Solís Fonseca, Gustavo. (2003). Lenguas en la amazonía peruana. Lima: edición por demanda.
 Zamponi, Raoul. (2003). Maipure, Munich: Lincom Europa. .

Lexicons
Cadete, C. (1991). Dicionário Wapichana-Português/Português-Wapishana. São Paulo: Edições Loyola.
Captain, D. M.; Captain, L. B. (2005). Diccionario Basico: Ilustrado; Wayuunaiki-Espanol ; Espanol-Wayuunaiki. Bogota: Edit. Fundación para el Desarrollo de los Pueblos Marginados.
Corbera Mori, A. (2005). As línguas Waurá e Mehinakú do Brasil Central. In: A. S. A. C. Cabral & S. C. S. de Oliveira (eds.), Anais do IV Congresso Internacional da ABRALIN, 795-804. Brasília: Associação Brasileira de Lingüística, Universidade de Brasília.
Couto, F. P. (2012). Contribuições para a fonética e fonologia da língua Manxineru (Aruák). Brasília: Universidade de Brasília. (Masters dissertation).
Couto, F. P. (n.d.). Dados do manxineri. (Manuscript).
Crevels, M.; Van Der Voort, H. (2008). The Guaporé-Mamoré region as a linguistic area. In: P. Muysken (ed.), From linguistic areas to areal linguistics (Studies in Language Companion Series, 90), 151-179. Amsterdam, Philadelphia: John Benjamins.
de Créqui-Montfort, G.; Rivet, P. (1913b). Linguistique Bolivienne: La langue Lapaču ou Apolista. Zeitschrift für Ethnologie, 45:512-531.
de Créqui-Montfort, G.; Rivet, P. (1913c). Linguistique bolivienne. La langue Saraveka. Journal de la Sociétè des Americanistes de Paris, 10:497-540.
Dixon, R. M. W.; Aikhenvald, A. (eds.) (1999). The Amazonian Languages. Cambridge: Cambridge University Press.
Duff-Tripp, M. (1998). Diccionario: Yanesha' (Amuesha) - Castellano. (Serie Lingüística Peruana, 47.) Lima: Inst. Lingüístico de Verano.
Ekdahl, E. M.; Butler, N. E. (1969). Terêna dictionary. Brasília: SIL. ELIAS ORTIZ, S. (1945). Los Indios Yurumanguíes. Acta Americana, 4:10-25.
Facundes, S. Da S. (2000). The Language of the Apurinã People of Brazil (Maipure/Arawak). University of New York at Buffalo. (Doctoral dissertation).
Farabee, W. C. (1918). The Central Arawaks (University Museum Anthropological Publication, 9). Philadelphia: University Museum.
Fargetti, C. M. (2001). Estudo Fonológico e Morfossintático da Língua Juruna. Campinas: UNICAMP. (Doctoral dissertation).
Gill, W. (1993 [1970]). Diccionario Trinitario-Castellano y Castellano-Trinitario. San Lorenzo de Mojos: Misión Evangélica Nuevas Tribus.
Green, D.; Green, H. G. (1998). Yuwit kawihka dicionário Palikúr - Português. Belém: SIL.
Jolkesky, M. P. V. (2016). Uma reconstrução do proto-mamoré-guaporé (família arawak). LIAMES, 16.1:7-37.
Kindberg, L. D. (1980). Diccionario asháninca (Documento de Trabajo, 19). Yarinacocha: Summer Institute of Linguistics.
Mehináku, M. (n.d.). Vocabulário mehinaku. (Manuscript).
Mosonyi, J. C. (1987). El idioma yavitero: ensayo de gramática y diccionario. Caracas: Universidad Central de Venezuela. (Doctoral dissertation).
Nies, J., et alii (1986). Diccionario Piro. Tokanchi Gikshijikowaka-Steno (Serie Lingüística Peruana, 22). Yarinacocha: Summer Institute of Linguistics.
Ott, W.; Burke de Ott, R. (1983). Diccionario Ignaciano y Castellano: con apuntes gramaticales. Cochabamba: Inst. Lingüístico de Verano.
Parker, S. (1995). Datos de la lengua Iñapari. (Documento de Trabajo, 27). Yarinacocha: Summer Institute of Linguistics.
Parker, S. (2010). Chamicuro data: exhaustive list. (SIL Language and Culture Documentation and Description, 12). SIL International.
Payne, D. L. (1991). A classification of Maipuran (Arawakian) languages based on shared lexical retentions. In: D. C. Derbyshire & G. K. Pullun (orgs.), Handbook of Amazonian languages, 355-499. The Hague: Mouton.
Ramirez, H. (2001a). Dicionário Baniwa-Portugues. Manaus: Universidade do Amazonas.
Ramirez, H. (2001b). Línguas Arawak da Amazônia Setentrional. Manaus: EDUA.
Shaver, H. (1996). Diccionario nomatsiguenga-castellano, castellano-nomatsiguenga (Serie Linguística Peruana, 41). Pucallpa: Ministerio de Educación & Summer Institute of Linguistics.
Snell, B. (1973). Pequeño diccionario machiguenga-castellano. Yarinacocha: SIL.
Solís, G.; Snell, B. E. (2005). Tata onkantakera niagantsipage anianeegiku (Diccionario escolar Machiguenga). Lima, Perú: Summer Institute of Linguistics.
Souza, I. (2008). Koenukunoe emo'u: A língua dos índios Kinikinau. Universidade Estadual de Campinas. (Doctoral dissertation).
Suazo, S. (2011). Lila Garifuna: Diccionario Garífuna: Garifuna - Español. Tegucigalpa, Honduras: Litografía López.
Trevor R. A. (1979). Vocabulario Resígaro (Documento de Trabajo, 16). Yarinacocha: Summer Institute of Linguistics.
Tripp, M. D. (1998). Diccionario Yanesha' (Amuesha)-Castellano. (Serie Lingüística Peruana, 47). Lima: Ministerio de Educación / Summer Institute of Linguistics.
Wapishana Language Project. (2000). Scholars's dictionary and grammar of the Wapishana language. Porto Velho: SIL International.
Durbin, M.; Seijas, H. (1973). A Note on Panche, Pijao, Pantagora (Palenque), Colima and Muzo. International Journal of American Linguistics, 39:47-51.

Data sets
Thiago Costa Chacon. (2018, November 27). CLDF dataset derived from Chacon et al.'s "Diversity of Arawakan Languages" from 2019 (Version v1.0.1). Zenodo. 
Thiago Costa Chacon. (2018). CLDF dataset derived from Chacon's "Arawakan and Tukanoan contacts in Northwest Amazonia prehistory" from 2017 (Version v1.1) [Data set]. Zenodo. 
Thiago Costa Chacon. (2018). CLDF dataset derived from Chacon's "Annotated Swadesh Lists for Arawakan Languages" from 2017 (Version v1.0.1) [Data set]. Zenodo. 

Reconstructions
Matteson, E. (1972). Proto Arawakan. In: E. Matteson et al. (eds.), Comparative Studies in Amerindian Languages, 160-242. The Hague and Paris: Mouton.
Noble, G. K. (1965). Proto-Arawakan and its descendants. Publications of the Indiana University Research Center in Anthropology, Folklore, and Linguistics, 38. Bloomington: Indiana University Press.
Valenti, D. M. (1986). A Reconstruction of the Proto-Arawakan Consonantal System. New York University. (Doctoral thesis).

External links 

 Arawak Languages - Linguistics - Oxford Bibliographies
 South American Phonological Inventory Database

 
Language families
Macro-Arawakan languages